Campagne-lès-Hesdin (literally Campagne near Hesdin) is a commune in the Pas-de-Calais department in northern France.

Geography
On the D138, between the towns of Hesdin and Montreuil and the valleys of the rivers Canche and Authie, the town is surrounded by sheep- and dairy-farming.

International relations

Campagne-lès-Hesdin is twinned with:
 Adisham, United Kingdom

Population

See also
Communes of the Pas-de-Calais department

References

Campagneleshesdin